Vesna Zmijanac (born 4 January 1957) is a Montenegrin-born Serbian singer and actress. Dubbed the "Queen of Sadness", she is known for her emotional vocal delivery and melancholic ballads. Also noted for her provocative appearance and western-influenced image, Zmijanac debuted in 1979 and had the biggest success during the 80s and 90s in SFR Yugoslavia. She has established herself as one of the most successful Serbian folk singers of all time, having sold around 6.7 million records. Zmijanac has also experienced popularity in the neighboring countries like Bulgaria.

Additionally, Zmijanac appeared in the movie Sok od šljiva (1981) and the reality television shows Survivor Srbija VIP: Philippines (2010) and Farma (2016). She is the mother of singer Nikolija Jovanović.

Early life
Vesna Zmijanac was born on 4 January 1957 in Nikšić, PR Montenegro, FPR Yugoslavia to mother Kovina from Kraljevo, SR Serbia and father Dušan from Sisak, SR Croatia. Her parents divorced when she was just a year old, as they believed that they were too young to be married. Subsequently, Zmijanac was raised by her maternal grandmother in the village of Kovače near Kraljevo because her parents went abroad to work. Zmijanac also briefly lived in Vienna with her mother, where she attended high school, from which she eventually dropped out. She did, however, finish a typing course.

According to Zmijanac, she showed interest in music from an early age, citing Šaban Šaulić, Esma Redžepova and Safet Isović as the biggest influences on her vocal performance.

Career
While living in Vienna, Zmijanac was discovered by singer Šaban Šaulić, who offered her to join him on his European tour. Šaulić also helped her get a recording contract with PGP-RTB, under which she released her first single "Hvala ti za sve" in 1979. Three years later, she starred in the movie Sok od šljiva, directed by Branko Baletić. Her first album, Ljubi me, ljubi, lepoto moja, was released in 1982. Zmijanac also made a cameo in the television series Kamiondžije ponovo voze in 1984. 

During the early eighties, she started collaborating with Miroljub Aranđelović Kemiš, who wrote her first bigger hit - "Nevera moja" (1975). Her fifth album, titled Dođi što pre, was released the following year, selling 400,000 copies. Same year, she won the grand prix at the International Music Fair (MESAM) in Belgrade with the song "Kraj nogu ti mrem". The album was also followed with her first national tour. With this success Zmijanac was propelled into the first rank of Yugoslavian singers, only competing with Lepa Brena. The follow-up album, Jedini si ti, was sold in half a million copies. Her 1987 album, titled Istina, was sold in 850,000 copies, making it of one the best-selling albums in the former Yugoslavia. The album featured a popular duet with Dino Merlin, called "Kad zamirišu jorgovani". Zmijanac embarked on her second tour, performing at the Hala Pionir, Belgrade and Zetra Olympic Hall, Sarajevo to over 10,000 people. Other big hits of hers from this period include "Ne kunite crne oči" (1986), "Kunem ti se životom" (1987) and "Kazni me, kazni" (1988).

In 1990, Zmijanac released her eighth studio album Svatovi, under new label Komuna, which was promoted with a tour and ten consecutive concerts at the Belgrade's Sava Centar. During the nineties, four more bodies of work were released, on which she collaborated with the likes of Momčilo Bajagić Bajaga and Rambo Amadeus. These albums include popular songs such as "Svatovi" (1990), "Idem preko zemlje Srbije" (1994), "Ja imam nekog, a ti si sam" (1994) featuring Slavko Banjac, "Malo po malo" (1995) and "Da budemo noćas zajedno" (1997). 

In the year 2000, Zmijanac published a book called Kad zamirišu jorgovani, which was described by her as "an attempt at an autobiography". In October 2010, she participated on Survivor Srbija VIP: Philippines alongside her daughter, Nikolija. Zmijanac was the second contestant to be eliminated on the show. Her final album to date Sokol was released in 2011 through PGP-RTS. Zmijanac competed on the seventh and final season of the reality television show Farma. She eventually voluntarily left the show after finding out that her daughter is pregnant. In December 2019, Vesna Zmijanac, among other artists, received the Life Achievement Award from the Union of Serbia's Music Artists. In October 2020, she was proclaimed the National Music Artist of Serbia by the Folk Music Assembly of Serbia.

Private life
During the 1980s, Zmijanac was for three years married to songwriter and instrumentalist Miroljub Aranđelović Kemiš, who later remarried to singer Zorica Brunclik. 

From her second marriage with the former chief of marketing at PGP-RTS, Vlada Jovanović, she has a daughter Nikolija (born 19 October 1989), who is also a well-known singer.

Discography
Studio albums
 Ljubi me, ljubi, lepoto moja (1982)
 Ti mali (1983)
 Šta će meni šminka? (1984)
 Zar bi me lako drugome dao (1985)
 Dođi što pre (1986)
 Jedan si ti (1987)
 Istina (1988)
 Svatovi  (1990)
 Ako me umiriš sad (1992)
 Idem preko zemlje Srbije (1994)
 Malo po malo (1995)
 Posle svega, dobro sam (1997)
 Šta ostane kad padnu haljine (2003)
 Sokole (2011)

Filmography

See also
Music of Serbia
List of singers from Serbia
Turbo-folk

References

External links

1957 births
Living people
Musicians from Nikšić
Musicians from Kraljevo
20th-century Montenegrin women singers
Montenegrin folk singers
20th-century Serbian women singers
Serbian folk singers
Serbian folk-pop singers
Yugoslav women singers
Grand Production artists
Montenegrin expatriates in Serbia
21st-century Montenegrin women singers
21st-century Serbian women singers
Montenegrin people of Serbian descent
Serbs of Montenegro